For the Summer Olympics, there are 29 venues that have been or will be used for basketball. The first official venue was outdoors under the auspices of the International Basketball Federation although the game was played indoors. Being played on tennis courts of clay, the final was held in a heavy rain which turned the courts into mud. Since those games, the basketball games have been played indoors.

References

Venues

Basketball
Olympic venues